Echeveria agavoides, or lipstick echeveria, is a species of flowering plant in the family Crassulaceae, native to rocky areas of Mexico, notably the states of San Luis Potosí, Hidalgo, Guanajuato and Durango.

Description
It is often solitary, but old plants in good condition grow offsets. The leaves are green, triangular, thicker (6 mm) and more acute than the other echeverias - hence the explanation of their name agavoides, "looking like an agave". Some varieties with bright light have reddish (or bronze) tips and some forms have slightly red to very red margins. The flowers are pink, orange or red, the petals tipped with dark yellow.

Etymology
Echeveria is named for Atanasio Echeverría y Godoy, a botanical illustrator who contributed to Flora Mexicana.

Agavoides means 'resembling Agave.'

Taxonomy
Varieties:
Echeveria agavoides var. agavoides
Echeveria agavoides var. corderoyi (Baker) Poelln.
Echeveria agavoides var. multifida E.Walther
Echeveria agavoides var. prolifera E.Walther

Cultivars:
'Aquamarine', with icy, emerald-green leaves.
'Ebony', lighter-coloured leaves (almost beige or peach) with dark brown edges, almost burgundy.
'Lipstick', neon green leaves with irregular red leaf edges.
'Luming', with reddish, maroon-magenta leaves, maturing to dark purple; also has rather pointed leaves.
'Oculus', with an entirely burgundy-reddish colour.
'Rose Garnet', faint neon-green leaves of rather large and sturdy shape, tipped with magenta pink and maturing to red.
'Rubra', with dark reddish leaves growing in a notably tight, almost "closed" rosette.
'Salu' grows in a considerably tighter, closed rosette, with pale green leaves lightly tipped in red. Small "point" to the ends of the leaves, which mature to red.

Cultivation
As with most echeverias, E. agavoides may be harmed by moisture and prefers mineral soils, growing best in light and even direct sunshine, which aids flowering. In temperate regions they must be kept indoors during winter, but may be placed outside during the summer months.

This plant has gained the Royal Horticultural Society's Award of Garden Merit.

Many hybrids have been created to obtain more brightly colored flowers or leaves.

The easiest methods of propagation are leaf cuttings and division of older plants. It propagates easily from cutting the stem although propagation from leaves can be more difficult. In order to propagate, one must take a sharp sterilized knife or scissors to cut away at the stem or leaves. Time must pass to allow for callousing before replanting.

References

Attila Kapitany, (2009). Knowing Echeverias, Cactus and Succulent Journal, Volume 81 Issue 2.

External links

Cactuspedia.info: Echeveria agavoides
Flora Mexicana via Biodiversity Library

Endemic flora of Mexico
Flora of Central Mexico
Flora of Durango
Flora of Guanajuato
Flora of Hidalgo (state)
Flora of San Luis Potosí
Plants described in 1863
Garden plants of North America
Drought-tolerant plants
Taxa named by Charles Antoine Lemaire
agavoides